The 2021 Football South Australia season was the 115th season of soccer in South Australia, and the ninth under the National Premier Leagues format.

The men's competitions consisted of three major divisions across the State. The season commenced on 9 April, and finished with the State League 2 Grand final on 20 October, the State League 1 Grand final on 21 October, and the NPL Grand final on 22 October.

Men's Competitions

2021 National Premier Leagues South Australia

The 2021 National Premier League South Australia, known as the RAA National Premier League for sponsorship reasons, was the ninth season of soccer under the competition format in South Australia. It is the first tier of South Australian soccer and the second tier of Australian soccer The Premier qualifies for the 2021 National Premier Leagues finals series. The fixtures were released on 5 March.

League table

Finals

2021 State League 1 South Australia

The 2021 State League 1 South Australia is the ninth season of soccer under the competition format in South Australia. It is the second tier of South Australian soccer and the third tier of Australian soccer. The fixtures were released on 5 March.

League table

Finals

2021 State League 2 South Australia
The 2021 State League 2 South Australia is the fifth season of soccer under the competition format in South Australia. It is the third tier of South Australian soccer and the fourth tier of Australian soccer. The fixtures were released on 5 March.

League table

Finals

Cup Competitions

2021 Federation Cup

The 2021 Football South Australia Federation Cup was the 108th running of the Federation Cup, the main soccer knockout competition in South Australia. The competition ran alongside the 2021 FFA Cup, with the two finalists qualifying for the competition. Teams from the National Premier Leagues South Australia, State League 1 South Australia, State League 2 South Australia. South Australian Collegiate Soccer League and South Australian Amateur Soccer League participated.

Adelaide Olympic were champions.

Bracket

References

Football South Australia seasons